Thích Quảng Đức (1897 – 11 June 1963; born Lâm Văn Túc) was a Vietnamese Mahayana Buddhist monk who burned himself to death at a busy Saigon road intersection on 11 June 1963. Quảng Đức was protesting against the persecution of Buddhists by the South Vietnamese government led by Ngô Đình Diệm, a staunch Roman Catholic. Photographs of his self-immolation circulated around the world, drawing attention to the policies of the Diệm government. John F. Kennedy said of one photograph, "No news picture in history has generated so much emotion around the world as that one." Malcolm Browne won the World Press Photo of the Year for his photograph of the monk's death.

Quảng Đức's act increased international pressure on Diệm and led him to announce reforms with the intention of mollifying the Buddhists. However, the promised reforms were not implemented, leading to a deterioration in the dispute. As protests continued, the ARVN Special Forces loyal to Diệm's brother, Ngô Đình Nhu, launched raids across South Vietnam on Buddhist pagodas, seizing Quảng Đức's heart and causing deaths and widespread damage. Several Buddhist monks followed Quảng Đức's example, also immolating themselves. Eventually, a U.S.-backed coup toppled Diệm, who was assassinated on 2 November 1963.

Biography
Accounts of the life of Quảng Đức are derived from information disseminated by Buddhist organizations. He was born in the village of Hội Khánh, in Vạn Ninh District of Khánh Hòa Province in central Vietnam as Lâm Văn Túc, one of seven children of Lâm Hữu Ứng and his wife, Nguyễn Thị Nương. At the age of seven, he left to study Buddhism under Hòa thượng Thích Hoằng Thâm, who was his maternal uncle and spiritual master. Thích Hoằng Thâm raised him as a son and Lâm Văn Túc changed his name to Nguyễn Văn Khiết. At age 15, he took the samanera (novice) vows and was ordained as a monk at age 20 under the dharma name Thích Quảng Đức. The Vietnamese name Thích (釋) is from "Thích Ca" or "Thích Già" (釋迦), means "of the Shakya clan." After ordination, he traveled to a mountain near Ninh Hòa, vowing to live the life of a solitary Buddhism-practicing hermit for three years. He returned in later life to open the Thien Loc pagoda at his mountain retreat.

After his self-imposed isolation ended, he began to travel around central Vietnam expounding the dharma. After two years, he went into retreat at the Sac Tu Thien An pagoda near Nha Trang. In 1932, he was appointed an inspector for the Buddhist Association in Ninh Hòa before becoming the inspector of monks in his home province of Khánh Hòa. During this period in central Vietnam, he was responsible for the construction of 14 temples. In 1934, he moved to southern Vietnam and traveled throughout the provinces spreading Buddhist teachings. During his time in southern Vietnam, he also spent two years in Cambodia studying the Theravada Buddhist tradition.

Upon his return from Cambodia, he oversaw the construction of a further 17 new temples during his time in the south. The last of the 31 new temples that he was responsible for constructing was the Quan The Am pagoda in the Phú Nhuận District of Gia Định Province on the outskirts of Saigon. The street on which the temple stands was later renamed Quảng Đức Street in 1975. After the temple-building phase, Quảng Đức was appointed to serve as the Chairman of the Panel on Ceremonial Rites of the Congregation of Vietnamese Monks, and as abbot of the Phuoc Hoa pagoda, which was the initial location of the Association for Buddhist Studies of Vietnam (ABSV). When the office of the ABSV was relocated to the Xá Lợi Pagoda, the main pagoda of Saigon, Quảng Đức resigned.

Self-immolation

Religious background

In a country where surveys of the religious composition at the time estimated the Buddhist majority to be between 70 and 90 percent, President Diệm was a member of the Catholic minority, and pursued discriminatory policies favoring Catholics for public service and military promotions, as well as in the allocation of land, business arrangements and tax concessions. Diệm once told a high-ranking officer, forgetting that the officer was from a Buddhist family, "Put your Catholic officers in sensitive places. They can be trusted." Many officers in the Army of the Republic of Vietnam (ARVN) converted to Roman Catholicism as their military prospects depended on it. Additionally, the distribution of firearms to village self-defense militias saw weapons given only to Roman Catholics, with some Buddhists in the army being denied promotion if they refused to convert to Roman Catholicism.

Some Catholic priests ran their own private armies; there were forced conversions, looting, shelling, and demolition of pagodas in some areas, to which the government turned a blind eye. Some Buddhist villages converted en masse to receive aid or avoid being forcibly resettled by Diệm's regime. The "private" status that was imposed on Buddhism by the French, which required official permission to be obtained by those wishing to conduct public Buddhist activities, was not repealed by Diệm. Catholics were also de facto exempt from corvée labor, which the government obliged all citizens to perform, and United States aid was distributed disproportionately to Catholic majority villages by Diệm's regime.

The Catholic Church was the largest landowner in the country and enjoyed special exemptions in property acquisition, and land owned by the Catholic Church was exempt from land reform. The white and gold Vatican flag was regularly flown at all major public events in South Vietnam, and Diệm dedicated his country to the Virgin Mary in 1959.

Buddhist discontent erupted following a ban in early May on flying the Buddhist flag in Huế on Vesak, the birthday of Gautama Buddha. Just days before, Catholics had been encouraged to fly the Vatican flag at a celebration for Archbishop Ngô Đình Thục of Huế, Diệm's elder brother. A large crowd of Buddhists protested the ban, defying the government by flying Buddhist flags on the Buddhist holy day of Vesak and marching on the government broadcasting station. Government forces fired into the crowd of protesters, killing nine people. Diệm's refusal to take responsibility—he blamed the Viet Cong for the deaths—led to further Buddhist protests and calls for religious equality. As Diệm remained unwilling to comply with Buddhist demands, the frequency of protests increased.

Day of the act

On 10 June 1963, U.S. correspondents were informed that "something important" would happen the following morning on the road outside the Cambodian embassy in Saigon. Most of the reporters disregarded the message, since the Buddhist crisis had at that point been going on for more than a month, and the next day only a few journalists turned up, including David Halberstam of The New York Times and Malcolm Browne, the Saigon bureau chief for the Associated Press (AP). Quảng Đức arrived as part of a procession that had begun at a nearby pagoda. Around 350 monks and nuns marched in two phalanxes, preceded by an Austin Westminster sedan, carrying banners printed in both English and Vietnamese. They denounced the Diệm government and its policy towards Buddhists, demanding that it fulfill its promises of religious equality. Another monk offered himself, but Quảng Đức's seniority prevailed.

The act occurred at the intersection of Phan Đình Phùng Boulevard (now Nguyễn Đình Chiểu Street) and Lê Văn Duyệt Street (now Cách Mạng Tháng Tám Street), a few blocks southwest of the Presidential Palace (now the Reunification Palace). Quảng Đức emerged from the car along with two other monks. One placed a cushion on the road while the second opened the trunk and took out a five-gallon petrol can. As the marchers formed a circle around him, Quảng Đức calmly sat down in the traditional Buddhist meditative lotus position on the cushion. A colleague emptied the contents of the petrol container over Quảng Đức's head. Quảng Đức rotated a string of wooden prayer beads and recited the words  ("Homage to Amitābha Buddha") before striking a match and dropping it on himself. Flames consumed his robes and flesh, and black oily smoke emanated from his burning body.

Quảng Đức's last words before his self-immolation were documented in a letter he had left: 

David Halberstam wrote: 

The spectators were mostly stunned into silence, but some wailed and several began praying. Many of the monks and nuns, as well as some shocked passersby, prostrated themselves before the burning monk. Even some of the policemen, who had orders to control the gathered crowd, prostrated before him.

In English and Vietnamese, a monk repeated into a microphone: "A Buddhist priest burns himself to death. A Buddhist priest becomes a martyr." After approximately 10 minutes, Quảng Đức's body was fully immolated and it eventually toppled backwards onto its back. Once the fire subsided, a group of monks covered the smoking corpse with yellow robes, picked it up and tried to fit it into a coffin, but the limbs could not be straightened and one of the arms protruded from the wooden box as he was carried to the nearby Xá Lợi Pagoda in central Saigon. Outside the pagoda, students unfurled bilingual banners which read: "A Buddhist priest burns himself for our five requests."

By 1:30p.m. (13:30), around 1,000 monks had congregated inside to hold a meeting, while outside a large crowd of pro-Buddhist students had formed a human barrier around it. The meeting soon ended and all but 100 monks slowly left the compound. Nearly 1,000 monks, accompanied by laypeople, returned to the cremation site. The police lingered nearby. At around 6:00p.m. (18:00), thirty nuns and six monks were arrested for holding a prayer meeting on the street outside Xá Lợi. The police encircled the pagoda, blocking public passage and giving observers the impression that an armed siege was imminent by donning riot gear.

Funeral and aftermath
After the self-immolation, the U.S. put more pressure on Diệm to re-open negotiations on the faltering agreement. Diệm had scheduled an emergency cabinet meeting at 11:30 on 11 June to discuss the Buddhist crisis which he believed to be winding down. Following Quảng Đức's death, Diệm canceled the meeting and met individually with his ministers. Acting U.S. Ambassador to South Vietnam William Trueheart warned Nguyễn Đình Thuận, Diệm's Secretary of State, of the desperate need for an agreement, saying that the situation was "dangerously near breaking point" and expected Diệm would meet the Buddhists' five-point manifesto. United States Secretary of State Dean Rusk warned the Saigon embassy that the White House would publicly announce that it would no longer "associate itself" with the regime if this did not occur. The Joint Communiqué and concessions to the Buddhists were signed on 16 June.

15 June was set as the date for the funeral, and on that day 4,000 people gathered outside the Xá Lợi pagoda, only for the ceremony to be postponed. Following the signing of the Joint Communiqué, attendance was limited by agreement between Buddhist leaders and police to approximately 500 monks.

Intact heart and symbolism

The body was re-cremated during the funeral, but Quảng Đức's heart remained intact and did not burn. It was considered to be holy and placed in a glass chalice at Xá Lợi Pagoda. The intact heart relic is regarded as a symbol of compassion. Quảng Đức has subsequently been revered by Vietnamese Buddhists as a bodhisattva (Bồ Tát), and accordingly is often referred to in Vietnamese as Bồ Tát Thích Quảng Đức. On 21 August, the ARVN Special Forces of Nhu attacked Xá Lợi and other Buddhist pagodas across Vietnam. The secret police intended to confiscate Quảng Đức's ashes, but two monks had escaped with the urn, jumping over the back fence and finding safety at the U.S. Operations Mission next door. Nhu's men managed to confiscate Đức's charred heart.

The location chosen for the self-immolation, in front of the Cambodian embassy, raised questions as to whether it was coincidence or a symbolic choice. Trueheart and embassy official Charles Flowerree felt that the location was selected to show solidarity with the Cambodian government of Prince Norodom Sihanouk. South Vietnam and Cambodia had strained relations: in a speech on 22 May, Sihanouk had accused Diệm of mistreating Vietnamese and ethnic minority Khmer Buddhists. The pro-Diệm Times of Vietnam published an article on 9 June which claimed that Cambodian monks had been encouraging the Buddhist crisis, asserting it was part of a Cambodian plot to extend its neutralist foreign policy into South Vietnam. Flowerree noted that Diệm was "ready and eager to see a fine Cambodian hand in all the organized Buddhist actions".

Diệm reaction

Diệm made a radio address at 19:00 on the day of Quảng Đức's death, asserting that he was profoundly troubled by the event. He appealed for "serenity and patriotism", and announced that stalled negotiations would resume with the Buddhists. He claimed that negotiations had been progressing well and in a time of religious tension emphasized the role of the Roman Catholic philosophy of personalism in his rule. He alleged that extremists had twisted the facts and he asserted that the Buddhists can "count on the Constitution, in other words, me."

The ARVN responded to the appeal, putting on a show of solidarity behind Diệm to isolate dissident officers. Thirty high-ranking officers headed by General Lê Văn Tỵ declared their resolve to carry out all missions entrusted to the army for the defense of the constitution and the Republic. The declaration was a veneer which masked a developing plot to oust Diệm. Some of the signatories were to become personally involved in Diệm's overthrow and death in November. Generals Dương Văn Minh and Trần Văn Đôn, the presidential military advisor and the chief of the army who were to lead the coup, were overseas.

Madame Nhu (a Catholic convert from Buddhism and the wife of Diệm's younger brother and chief adviser Ngô Đình Nhu), who was regarded as the First Lady of South Vietnam at the time (as Diệm was a bachelor), said she would "clap hands at seeing another monk barbecue show". Later that month, Diệm's government charged that Quảng Đức had been drugged before being forced to commit suicide. The regime also accused Browne of bribing Quảng Đức to burn himself.

Political and media impact
Photographs taken by Malcolm Browne of the self-immolation quickly spread across the wire services and were featured on the front pages of newspapers worldwide. The self-immolation was later regarded as a turning point in the Buddhist crisis and a critical point in the collapse of the Diệm regime.

Historian Seth Jacobs asserted that Quảng Đức had "reduced America's Diệm experiment to ashes as well" and that "no amount of pleading could retrieve Diệm's reputation" once Browne's images had become ingrained into the psyche of the world public. Ellen Hammer described the event as having "evoked dark images of persecution and horror corresponding to a profoundly Asian reality that passed the understanding of Westerners." John Mecklin, an official from the U.S. embassy, noted that the photograph "had a shock effect of incalculable value to the Buddhist cause, becoming a symbol of the state of things in Vietnam." William Colby, then chief of the Central Intelligence Agency's Far East Division, opined that Diệm "handled the Buddhist crisis fairly badly and allowed it to grow. But I really don't think there was much they could have done about it once that bonze burned himself."

President John F. Kennedy, whose government was the main sponsor of Diệm's regime, learned of Quảng Đức's death when handed the morning newspapers while he was talking to his brother, Attorney General Robert F. Kennedy, on the phone. Kennedy reportedly interrupted their conversation about segregation in Alabama by exclaiming "Jesus Christ!" He later remarked that "no news picture in history has generated so much emotion around the world as that one." U.S. Senator Frank Church (D-Idaho), a member of the Senate Foreign Relations Committee, claimed that "such grisly scenes have not been witnessed since the Christian martyrs marched hand in hand into the Roman arenas."

In Europe, the photographs were sold on the streets as postcards during the 1960s, and communist China distributed millions of copies of the photograph throughout Asia and Africa as evidence of what it called US imperialism. One of Browne's photographs remains affixed to the sedan in which Quảng Đức was riding and is part of a tourist attraction in Huế.
For Browne and the AP, the pictures were a marketing success. Ray Herndon, the United Press International (UPI) correspondent who had forgotten to take his camera on the day, was harshly criticized in private by his employer. UPI estimated that 5,000 readers in Sydney, then a city of around 1.5–2 million, had switched to AP news sources.

Diệm's English-language mouthpiece, the Times of Vietnam, intensified its attacks on both journalists and Buddhists. Headlines such as "Xá Lợi politburo makes new threats" and "Monks plot murder" were printed. One article questioned the relationship between the monks and the press by posing the question as to why "so many young girls are buzzing in and out of Xá Lợi early [in the day]" and then going on to allege that they were brought in for sexual purposes for the U.S. reporters.

Browne's photographs of Quảng Đức's death have been reproduced in popular media for decades, and the incident has been used as a touchstone reference in many films and television programs.

One of Browne's photographs was used for the cover of American rap metal band Rage Against the Machine's debut album which came out in 1992, as well as the cover of their single "Killing in the Name". Another was used for the cover of Canadian electronic act Delerium's debut album Faces, Forms & Illusions, which came out in 1989.

Precedents and influence
Despite the shock of the Western public, the practice of Vietnamese monks self-immolating was not unprecedented. Instances of self-immolations in Vietnam had been recorded for centuries, usually carried out to honor Gautama Buddha. The most recently recorded case had been in North Vietnam in 1950. The French colonial authorities had tried to eradicate the practice after their conquest of Vietnam in the nineteenth century, but had not been totally successful. They did manage to prevent one monk from setting fire to himself in Huế in the 1920s, but he managed to starve himself to death instead. During the 1920s and 1930s, Saigon newspapers reported multiple instances of self-immolations by monks in a matter-of-fact style. The practice had also been seen in the Chinese city of Harbin in 1948 when a monk seated down in the lotus position on a pile of sawdust and soybean oil and set fire to himself in protest against the treatment of Buddhism by the anti-religious communists of Mao Zedong. His heart remained intact, as did that of Quảng Đức.

After Quảng Đức, five more Buddhist monks self-immolated up until late October 1963 as the Buddhist protests in Vietnam escalated. On 1 November, the ARVN overthrew Diệm in a coup. Diệm and Nhu were assassinated the next day. Monks have followed Quảng Đức's example since for other reasons.

The Americans in Saigon often found the self-immolations to be surreal and made puns about "bonze fires" and "hot cross bonzes", almost as an escape mechanism from the bewilderment. In one instance in 1963, the young son of an American officer based at the Saigon U.S. Embassy doused himself with gasoline and set himself on fire. He was seriously burned before the fire was extinguished and later could only offer the explanation that "I wanted to see what it was like." Thich Quang Duc's actions were fatally copied in the United States in protest against the Vietnam War. On March 16, 1965, Alice Herz an 82-year-old peace activist immolated herself in front of the Federal Department Store in northwest Detroit. Later that same year, Norman Morrison, a 31-year-old Quaker pacifist, poured kerosene over himself and set light to himself below the third-floor window of Secretary of Defense Robert McNamara at the Pentagon on November 2, 1965.  A week later, Roger Allen LaPorte did the same thing in front of the United Nations in New York City.

See also

 List of civil rights leaders
 List of political self-immolations

Notes

References

Bibliography

External links

– Official Buddhist monastery dedicated to Thích Quảng Đức

Vietnamese Buddhists
Buddhism in Vietnam
20th-century Buddhist monks
1897 births
1963 suicides
Date of birth unknown
People from Khánh Hòa Province
Vietnamese Buddhist monks
Buddhist crisis
History of South Vietnam
Suicides in Vietnam
1963 in Vietnam
Filmed suicides
Vietnamese people of the Vietnam War
Self-immolations by Buddhists
Articles containing video clips
People notable for being the subject of a specific photograph
Suicides by self-immolation
Buddhist martyrs
Photographs of protests